Oliver Pett (born 19 October 1988 in Margate) is a former professional squash player who represents England. He reached a career-high world ranking of World No. 48 in October 2012.

References

External links 
 
 
 

English male squash players
Living people
1988 births